Naban is a traditional form of grappling from Myanmar.  Naban is integrated into other fighting styles instead of existing as a separate martial art.  Originally based on Indian wrestling, it is practiced primarily in rural areas. Naban is especially popular among the Kachin and Chin tribes that have Himalayan origins.  Techniques include joint locks, strikes to pressure points, palm strikes, foot strikes and chokeholds.  Any part of the opponent's body is a legal target.

See also
Bando
Banshay
Lethwei
Khmer traditional wrestling
Kyin 
Malla-yuddha

References

Burmese martial arts
Sport in Myanmar
Sports originating in Myanmar
Combat sports